Dipoli is the main building of Aalto University, located in the university's Otaniemi campus in Espoo, Finland. It was designed by architects Reima and Raili Pietilä and opened in 1966. Dipoli was initially owned by the Student Union of the Helsinki University of Technology who sold it to Aalto University in 2014.

Name
The name of the building is a pun: it can mean dipole in Finnish, but also "the second Poly", the second building of the polytechnic students. The original Polytechnic Students' Union, now called the "Old Poly", was a National Romantic building located on Lönnrotinkatu in Helsinki that was left behind when the university moved to Otaniemi.

History
Helsinki University of Technology moved from Helsinki to Espoo in the early 1960s, with the first buildings to be constructed designed by architect Alvar Aalto. In 1961 an architecture competition was held for what would become the new building for the Student Union of the university. Due to the challenging rocky location and adaptability requirements none of the competition entries fulfilled all the jury's demands and the first prize was not awarded: the second prize was shared by the architect couple Reima and Raili Pietilä and Osmo Lappo, who were asked to further develop their proposals. Finally, the design by the Pietiläs was chosen as the basis for the new building. Construction work began in 1965, and the building was ready for use in autumn 1966.

In 1993 the building was transformed into a training centre for the university due to high maintenance costs. Besides its primary role, Dipoli is still regularly used for conventions, congresses and student parties. The building houses over 20 conference rooms and auditoriums.

Dipoli was owned by the student union of Aalto University until 2013 when it was announced that the building would be sold to the university itself for an undisclosed sum. The building was extensively renovated between 2015 and 2017 turning it into the new main building for the university. The refurbished building includes an auditorium, restaurants and exhibitions spaces. The university's management also works in Dipoli.

Architecture

The building uses extensively materials from Finnish nature, such as pine wood, copper, and natural rocks. Dipoli has 500 windows of which only four are identical. The architects originally planned for as little interference with the natural granite of the site as possible; but blasting the hard granite base rock inevitably fragmented it. The building is seen as a key example of organic architecture. Reima Pietilä himself said of the building:

References

External links
 DIPOLI Congress Centre

Buildings and structures in Espoo
Convention centers in Finland
Modernist architecture in Finland
Aalto University
Reima and Raili Pietilä buildings